Planica 1969 was a first competition on a new ski flying hill at Smuški poleti Ski Flying Week competition, held from 21 to 23 March 1969 in Planica, Yugoslavia. With 95,000 people in three days.

Schedule

Competition
On 6 March 1969, two weeks before competition a hill test with trial jumper was made. Yugoslavian Miro Oman baptized Velikanka bratov Gorišek K153 hill around 14:00 PM local time with 135 metres (443 ft).

On 21 March 1969 hill was officially opened with first day of competition called Smuški poleti Ski Flying Week with three rounds, but only the best one counted into official result. The first day brought world record distance at 156 metres by Bjørn Wirkola.

On 22 March 1969 second day of competition was on schedule with three rounds and two best rounds counted into official result. World record was tied and improved three times: Jiří Raška (156 m, 164 m) and Bjørn Wirkola (160 m).

On 23 March 1969 third and final day of competition was on schedule with three rounds and two best rounds counted into official result in front of 45,000 people. Manfred Wolf set already the fifth and the last world record this weekend at 165 metres in the last round. Jiří Raška won the three day competition with total five valid rounds: one best from the first day, two best rounds from the second day and two best rounds from the third day.

Hill test

14:00 PM — 6 March 1969 — premiere

Ski Flying Week: Day 1
10:30 AM — 21 March 1969 — Three rounds: one best round into official results

Ski Flying Week: Day 2
10:30 AM — 22 March 1969 — Three rounds; two best into official results — Day 1 best round also calculated into points.

Ski Flying Week: Day 3
10:30 AM — 23 March 1969 — Three rounds; two best into official results — Day 1&2 best rounds also calculated into points.

 Best round for final result! Best round for final result & fall! World record! Fall or touch!

Official results

Five rounds counted into official results — one best round (D1) + two best rounds (D2) + two best rounds (D3).

Ski flying world records

References

1969 in Yugoslav sport
1969 in ski jumping
1969 in Slovenia
Ski jumping competitions in Yugoslavia
International sports competitions hosted by Yugoslavia
Ski jumping competitions in Slovenia
International sports competitions hosted by Slovenia
March 1969 sports events in Europe